Hardyville is a small unincorporated community and census-designated place (CDP) in Hart County, Kentucky, United States, located east of Munfordville on U.S. Route 31E. As of the 2010 census it had a population of 156. In the 2020 United States Census the population was 180.

A post office was established in the community in 1868. It was named in honor of a series of popular stump speeches given at the crossroads during the 1850s by local politician James Greene Hardy, Lieutenant Governor of Kentucky from 1855 to 1856.

Demographics

References

Unincorporated communities in Kentucky
Census-designated places in Hart County, Kentucky
Census-designated places in Kentucky
Unincorporated communities in Hart County, Kentucky